The 2021 Georgia State Panthers softball team represented Georgia State Panthers during the 2021 NCAA Division I softball season. The Panthers played their home games at Robert E. Heck Softball Complex. The Panthers were led by eleventh-year head coach Roger Kincaid and were members of the Sun Belt Conference.

Preseason

Sun Belt Conference Coaches Poll
The Sun Belt Conference Coaches Poll was released on February 8, 2021. Georgia State was picked to finish last in the Sun Belt Conference with 16 votes.

National Softball Signing Day

Roster

Coaching staff

Schedule and results

Schedule Source:
*Rankings are based on the team's current ranking in the NFCA/USA Softball poll.

References

Georgia State
Georgia State Panthers softball seasons
Georgia State softball